The 2008 Leeds Rhinos season saw the club compete in Super League XIII as well as the 2008 Challenge Cup tournament.

Events by month

February 
 Super League 13 Started on Friday, 2 February (ko 7.30pm )with Leeds beating Hull KR 20–12 at Headingley.
 29th, Leeds beat Australasian Grand Final winners Melbourne Storm in the 2008 World Club Challenge 10–4 at Elland Road.

March 
 The Rhinos lost their first game against Castleford Tigers on 7 March, (Round 5 of Super League) at The Jungle. This was also Castleford's first win of the season.

April 
 Super League club play first game in the Challenge cup.

May 
 Leeds Rhinos defeated Bradford Bulls 40–26 in the 2nd Millennium Magic at Cardiff's Millennium Stadium

June 
 Harlequins inflicted only the Rhinos 3rd defeat of the Season when they won 28–24 at the Twickenham Stoop

July 
 Leeds will play St. Helens in the Challenge Cup Semi Final on 26 July 2008.

2008 squad 

''As of 16 June 2008

2008 Player Signings/Transfers 
Gains

Losses

Coaching Set-Up

2008 Fixtures/Results 

2008 Engage Super League

*Round 4 played before round one to accommodate World Club Challenge on Round 4 weekend

**Round 13 played at Millennium Stadium, Cardiff.

***Carnegie Challenge Cup Semi-Final played at the Galpharm Stadium, Huddersfield

****engage Super League Grand Final played at Old Trafford, Manchester.

References 

Leeds Rhinos seasons
Leeds Rhinos season
Rugby